Hugh of Lucca or Hugh Borgognoni (also Ugo) was a medieval surgeon. He and Theodoric of Lucca, his son or student, are noted for their use of wine as an antiseptic in the early 13th century.

Hugh of Lucca
Hugh of Lucca – also known Ugo de Borgognoni, was born in 1160, around the time the teaching of corpus juris was said to be common where the University of Bologna had included the `healing art` of medicine into its subjects of grammar, dialectic, rhetoric, and the free subjects of music and astronomy. He was a physician at the end of the period where medicine was a profession transmitted from father to son via observations.

It is assumed that he arrived in Bologna, and continued his profession as a surgeon until his death there. Some regard him as the founder of the surgical school of Bologna, as he was the pioneer of a new wound treatment, and the starter of a new era. Although, it is also declared in some sources that in the early thirteenth century the Salernitan surgical traditions of the Medical School of Salerno had been bought to Bologna by Roland of Parma at the time Hugh of Lucca was employed by the city as the military surgeon.

He is also said to be a man of action, since he accompanied the Bolognese Army on the Fifth Crusade, visiting both Syria and Egypt and being present at the Siege of Dammietta in 1219. He is thought to gain a rich experience in not only the wounds of the soldiers but also on the Black Death, which was ravaging the opposing armies, during the lengthy period of time of conflict he was a witness to.

Acts in the Crusades 
Hugh of Lucca was initially an empiricist, challenging the doctrine of Galen by methods rooted in experiments and experiences. He advocated the aseptic theory against the conventional treatments that were generally used where suppuration and pus formation were thought necessary for healing. He condemned the laudable pus theory, which he regarded as `hindering the nature and prolonging the healing`.

While on the crusades, he travelled with the Bolognese army between 1218 and 1221. Over the time he was treating the war wounds, he came into the understanding that the best way to heal the wounds of the skull involved the prevention of suppuration.

In 1221, after his return to Bologna, he was appointed as a legal physician in the city; a position recorded for the first time and concerned with medical juris-prudence. Although he lived into his 90s, and assumedly passed away in 1259, it is continuously stated in sources that he left no written record, and all his achievements were noted down by Theodoric.

The Method of Hugh of Lucca: Innovations in Wound Treatment

For those wounded on the medieval battlefield, the odds of survival were not great. Despite being treated, many would die shortly afterwards from infections. In the thirteenth and fourteenth centuries, a small group of surgeons believed they had a better way of treating these injuries. But they would have to challenge hundreds of years of medical knowledge.
Hugh of Lucca (1160-1257), his pupil and son, Theodoric, Bishop of Cervia (1205-96), and French anatomist and surgeon Henri of Mondeville (1260-1320), who learned this method from studying Theodoric’s Surgery in medical courses taught by Jean Pitard (1235-1330) and Lanfranc of Milan (1250-1306) challenged the conventional treatment of wounds sustained in battle, which involved suppuration, or the encouragement of pus formation, held to be necessary in the healing process. They advocated and practiced a treatment known as the aseptic theory or dry method of wound treatment in which foreign objects were removed, haemorrhaging was stopped, and wounds were closed immediately. Upon closure, wounds were dressed in a dry cloth without encouraging pus formation or suppuration.The dry method of healing was controversial for two reasons. Firstly, it rejected conventional medical wisdom based on Galen and other ancient writers who believed that the healing was not possible without the removal of “bad humours”. Several experts have argued that the doctrine of the humours was so entrenched in the medieval medical community that to challenge it was an act of heresy. Any medic who opposed the thousand-year method of healing was maligned. Secondly, the dry method of healing repudiated a religious belief system that taught that the evacuation of bad humours was a cleansing of evil from the body. Suppuration was a form of exorcism. Medieval people often viewed disease and infection as punishment for bad behaviour. The individual needed to be cleansed both physically and spiritually.

Father and son 
The first proponent of the controversial method of wound treatment, Hugh of Lucca, born circa 1160, was a medicus possibly educated at Salerno. An October 1214 contract with the city of Bologna as a municipal surgeon stipulated that he would reside in that city for six months of the year and during periods of civil war. Residents, including inhabitants of the nearby countryside, would be treated free of charge. The contract also required that Hugh provide medical services to the army in the field. In return, he was paid 600 Bolognese lire per year and received some property. This has been called “the earliest undisputedexample in medieval Italy where a doctor was hired long term by a city to treat its population”.
Although he was over sixty years of age, Hugh accompanied Bolognese soldiers on the Fifth Crusade to Egypt between 1218 and 1221. Hugh’s wartime experience of treating injured Bolognese soldiers in the field convinced him that the most effective method of healing wounds of the skull was without the encouragement of suppuration. He recommended removing foreign objects from flesh wounds and cleansing the wound with wine-soaked cushions, then drying the wound immediately. Theodoric, who recorded his father and master’s techniques, described the procedure of treating wounds as “not only desirable but attainable,” and offered an explanation of the process: "Therefore in the case of a simple skin wound, if the lesion should not entail loss of tissue, or should be a lesion of the skull, you will treat it thus: in the first place, the lips of the wound, and all about the wound should be debrided; and then the wound should be completely cleansed of fuzz, hair, and anything else, and let the wound be wiped quite dry with fine lint soaked in warm wine and wrung out. Thus, the lips of the wound may be reunited as well as possible in accordance with their original healthy state and having made compresses from fine clean lint soaked in warm wine and placed upon the wound so as to fit, it be bound up with a light bandage in such a way that the reapproximation of the wound edges cannot be disturbed at all." "

The Usage of Wine

Why did he use wine in his method? 
Wine, throughout the history of medicine, was a commonly used ingredient. It was mainly used as a numbing or, preferred in more times, as an agent to ease and diminish the pain of the wounded patients. Wine was initially given orally during procedures involving the consumption of it. The main reason being that; once the patient drank the wine, they forgot about ever going through the painful operation, and they were unburdened of the trauma an operation of the likes would have caused.

Hugh of Lucca used wine as a means to disinfect the flesh wound. As the name of his technique “Antiseptic Technique” also suggests, it was primarily used by him for its antiseptic properties. In many cases he saw it fit to use wine, he boiled it. And then soaked either lint or compresses or both inside the boiled wine. Thus, he had the basic idea of wine, and wanted to prevent it from potentially getting contaminated through air.

His experiences gained during the Fifth Crusade by treating the wounded Bolognese soldiers have also aided in developing his technique, and this journey enabled him to lay the main outline of his ideas.

How did he use wine? 
Hugh of Lucca’s technique gained fame as he used wine directly on the wounds. His method of treating fresh wounds, followed by soaking lint in boiled wine, was used to clean the wound of any foreign materials as well as to disinfect the area. After this operation was successfully accomplished, he would cover the cleaned wound with a compress that had also been soaked in boiled wine.

When did he discover wine as a treatment? 
Unfortunately, there is no record stating the exact date of when he discovered this technique. However, the vast usage of wine by others during operations through history of medicine suggests it was used mostly mixed together with various herbs or numerous oils. The main and primary purpose of wine being used during surgical operations at these times was to drive off any sense of the patient and induce forgetfulness of the pain the next day of the operation.

Hugh of Lucca, on the other hand, relied mostly on practical knowledge by trial and error, as the philosophy he followed regarded experience as the sole source of knowledge. He found oils to be too slippery and hard to add his sources as a material for clinical operations to bond the two edges of the wound in surgeries. He preferred using wine instead, as it vaporized after a period of time, unlike oils in general, and dried with the wound while cleaning it with the alcohol inside.

Bibliography 
1.    Allbutt, T. Clifford, M.D.Cantab., F.R.S. An Address on THE HISTORICAL RELATIONS BETWEEN SURGERY AND MEDICINE. The British Medical Journal. The Medical Congres, St. Louis, Oct. 1, 1904: p. 789-792. Retrieved 10 April 2022

2.    Anonymous. Ugo Borgognoni. Wikipedia Article. Ugo Borgognoni. Retrieved 30 April 2022

3.    Cope, Sir Zachary, B.A., M.D., M.S., F.R.C.S. THE TREATMENT OF WOUNDS THROUGH THE AGES. Cambridge University Press: p.163-166. Retrieved 11 April 2022

4.    Edwards, Harold, CBE MS. Theodoric of Cervia, a Medieval Antiseptic Surgeon. Section of the History of Medicine Volume 69 August 1976: p.27-29. Retrieved 24 April 2022

5.    Gyorki, David E., MB BS. Laudable Pus: Historic Concept Revisited. CORRESPONDENCE ANZ J. Surg. 2005; 75: p.249–254. Retrieved 11 April 2022

6.    Robinson, Victor, M.D. VICTORY OVER PAIN. A History of Anesthesia. London Sigma Books: p.6-27. Retrieved 11 April 2022

7.    Schlich, Thomas. The Palgrave Handbook of the History of Surgery. Palgrave Macmillan 2018: p.31. Retrieved 10 April 2022

8.    Vasina, Augusto. BORGOGNONI, Ugo. Dizionario Biografico degli Italiani Volume 12 (1971) https://www.treccani.it/enciclopedia/ugo-borgognoni_%28Dizionario-Biografico%29/. Retrieved 5 May 2022

9.    Whaley, Leigh. Controversial Treatments, The Surgeons Who Tried To Change Medieval Battlefield Surgery. Medieval Warfare VIII-5: p.50-53. Retrieved 22 April 2022

See also
Surgery
Cauterisation
Ambroise Paré
John of Arderne
Infection
Lady Mary Wortley Montagu
Edward Jenner
Louis Pasteur
Robert Koch

References

Medieval surgeons